Rocky Harbour, or Rocky Harbor, may refer to: 

 Rocky Harbour (Hong Kong), a harbour in the Hong Kong Special Administrative Region of China
 Rocky Harbour, Newfoundland and Labrador, a village on the island of Newfoundland, Canada